Elijah Risley (May 7, 1787 – January 9, 1870) was a U.S. Representative from New York.

Born in Connecticut, Risley completed preparatory studies before moving to Fredonia, New York, in 1807, where he engaged in mercantile pursuits. Risley was the sheriff of Chautauqua County, New York from 1825 to 1828, and later became supervisor of the town of Pomfret in 1835.

From 1833 to 1853, he engaged in the culture of garden seeds.

Risley was elected as a Whig to the Thirty-first Congress on March 4, 1849, and served until March 3, 1851. He was not a candidate for renomination in 1850. He was also a Major General in the State militia.

Risley died in Fredonia, New York on January 9, 1870, and was interred in the East Main Street Cemetery.

Sources

External links

 

1787 births
1870 deaths
Whig Party members of the United States House of Representatives from New York (state)
People from Fredonia, New York
19th-century American politicians